Hertner is a German surname. Notable people with the surname include:

Fabian Hertner (born 1985), Swiss orienteer
Sebastian Hertner (born 1991), German footballer

See also
Herter
Hettner

German-language surnames